Vasilios Lykomitros (born 15 June 1962) is a Greek rower. He competed in the men's coxless four event at the 1988 Summer Olympics.

References

1962 births
Living people
Greek male rowers
Olympic rowers of Greece
Rowers at the 1988 Summer Olympics
Place of birth missing (living people)